(Music from and inspired by the film) Pigs Will Fly is the soundtrack for the German film, Pigs Will Fly (2002) directed by Eoin Moore. The soundtrack is a collaboration between musicians Warner Poland and Kai-Uwe Kohlschmidt and features singer-songwriter and guitarist, Chris Whitley. 

The soundtrack was produced, recorded, and, mixed by Warner Poland and Kai-Uwe Kohlschmidt. It was recorded at Monobeat Studio in Berlin, Germany.

Additional recording was done at The Himalaya Lounge in Berlin, Germany.

Track listing
All tracks written and performed by Warner Poland, Kai-Uwe Kohlschmidt and Chris Whitley unless otherwise noted.

 "Crystaline" – 3:56
 "Laxe 01" – 0:31
 "Dislocation Blues" – 2:30
 "Please Please" – 0:38
 "Breaking Your Fall" – 3:30
 "Gum" – 1:13
 "Frisco 01" – 1:27
 "Fine Day" – 3:53
 "Tijuana" – 0:41
 "Laxe 02" – 1:01
 "Velocity" – 0:53
 "Velocity Girl" – 4:27
 "Under the Bridge" – 1:27
 "Frisco 03" – 1:26
 "Summer's Gone" (Warner Poland, Marcellus Puhlemann, Michael O'Ryan) – 3:29
 "Laxe 06" – 0:53
 "Laxe on the Run" – 1:07
 "Crystaline (reprise)" – 1:55
 "Fleamarket" – 1:32
 "Piñata Baseball Bat" – 2:45
 "Laxe 05" – 1:31
 "Bridge Song" – 4:56
 "Laxe 03" – 1:37
 "Fine Day" (Film version) – 2:11
 "Frisco 02" – 1:25
 "Crystaline" (Film version) – 2:19
 "Ballad of the 'Musical' Truckers" (unlisted track) – 3:52

Personnel
Chris Whitley – vocals and Reso-Phonic guitar (1, 2, 5, 7, 8, 12, 18, 22, 24, 26); Reso-Phonic guitar (06, 11, 17)
Warner Poland – programming, guitars, bass, percussion, noises and sounds
Kai-Uwe Kohlschmidt – programming, guitars, bass, percussion, noises and sounds
Marcellus Puhlemann – drums
Wolfgang Glum – drums
Jan Hofmann – violin and viola
Maria Magdelena Wilsmaier – cello
Lutz Janus – double bassoon

Additional personnel
Trixie Whitley – backing vocals (12)
Heiko Schramm – bass (8, 12)
Matthias Macht – drums (8, 12)
Michael O'Ryan – bass (15)

Chris Whitley albums
2003 soundtrack albums
Film soundtracks